Midnite is an alternative spelling of midnight.

Midnite may also refer to:

Music
 Midnite (band), a roots reggae band from the U.S. Virgin Islands
 Midnite, a 2013 album by Salmo
 "Midnite", a 2002 song by Brent Jones & TP Mobb featuring Coko

Books
 Midnite: The Story of a Wild Colonial Boy, a 1967 children's book by Randolph Stow

Other uses
 Midnite Software Gazette, later merged into .info magazine
 Doctor Mid-Nite, also Doctor Midnight, the name of multiple fictional superheroes in DC Comics
 Papa Midnite, a DC and Vertigo Comics character from Hellblazer
 Tony Midnite (1926–2009), an American performer and activist

See also
 
 Midnight (disambiguation)